The Sounding Sky Reserve is an Indian reserve of the One Arrow First Nation in Saskatchewan. An urban reserve, it is in the city of Saskatoon.

References

Indian reserves in Saskatchewan
Urban Indian reserves in Canada
Saskatoon